Leave Me Alone is the debut album of Nick Oliveri's Uncontrollable, a solo project created by Nick Oliveri (Kyuss, Queens of the Stone Age, Dwarves, Mondo Generator) released in 2014 on Schnitzel Records.

It was recorded in 2013 at Thunder Underground Studios in Palm Springs, California by Harper Hug & Trevor Whatever. Nick Oliveri performs all of the instruments (vocals, guitar, bass & drums) on the album as well as all of the production & writing of the songs. He also recruited guest performers in such as Blag Dahlia of The Dwarves & Motörhead's Phil Campbell. The album is dedicated to deceased Eyehategod drummer Joey LaCaze.

Track listing

Credits
Nick Oliveri – lead vocals, guitar, acoustic guitar on "Leave Me Alone", bass guitar & drums

Additional musicians
Dean Ween – lead guitar on "Human Cannonball Explodes"
Stephen Haas – lead guitar on "Keep Me in the Loop"
Lightnin' Woodcock – lead guitar on "Luv Is Fiction"
Marc Diamond – lead guitar on "Luv Is Fiction" & "Come and You're Gone" 
Blag Dahlia – chorus vocals on "Come and You're Gone"
Phil Campbell – lead guitar on "The Robot Man"
"Rex Everything" – lead guitar on "Get Lost (With Me)"
Bruno Fevery – lead guitar on "The Void"
Mike Pygmie – lead guitar on "Death Leads The Way"

Additional personnel
Harper Hug & Trevor Whatever – recording
Mathias Schneeberger – mastering
Nere Neska – artwork

Additional credits
All songs written by Nick Oliveri & published by Natural Light Music.

Credits taken from liner notes.

References

2014 albums
Nick Oliveri albums